KTUW, UHF digital channel 16, was a television station licensed to Scottsbluff, Nebraska, United States. The station was owned by Equity Broadcasting.

The station signed on in 2006 as a Retro Television Network affiliate; at that time, Equity owned the network.  However, on January 4, 2009, a contract conflict between Equity and Luken Communications, LLC (who had acquired RTN in June 2008) interrupted the programming on many RTN affiliates. As a result, Luken moved RTN operations to its headquarters in Chattanooga, Tennessee, and dropped all Equity-owned affiliates, including KTUW, immediately; RTN would return to Scottsbluff via a subchannel of KDUH-TV that summer (by which time the network had been rebranded RTV). KTUW's replacement programming is unknown.

KTUW held a construction permit to move to digital channel 17 at increased power; this would not be built, as the station's license was canceled on June 8, 2009.

References

Equity Media Holdings
Television channels and stations established in 2006
Television channels and stations disestablished in 2009
Defunct television stations in the United States
2006 establishments in Nebraska
2009 disestablishments in Nebraska
Defunct mass media in Nebraska